Ablitech, Inc. is  a biotechnology company founded in Hattiesburg, Mississippi, USA, that specializes in the development and commercialization of platform technologies that heal and protect the human body.

History
Ablitech was co-founded in 2006 by Dr. Lisa Kemp, Dr. Nick Hammond and Dr. Kenneth Malone on technology licensed from The University of Southern Mississippi.

The formation of Ablitech was a direct result of the National Science Foundation program IGERT – an “interdisciplinary training program, educating U.S. Ph.D. scientists and engineers by building on the foundations of their disciplinary knowledge with interdisciplinary training.” 

In 2007, Ablitech received a SBIR Phase I for the development of a bio-transformable drug-eluting coronary stent. Then in 2008 they received another SBIR Phase I for the development of a cancer therapy.

Ablitech received the Mississippi Seed Fund Research and Development investment in 2009 and in 2010. Managed by the Mississippi Technology Alliance, the Mississippi Seed Fund provides high-tech, start-up companies with access to pre-seed financing, early stage risk capital, and product development capital to stimulate and accelerate the development of high-performance, technology-based business ventures in Mississippi.

In 2011, Ablitech received a $2 million grant from the Department of Defense to develop a siRNA based therapy for heterotopic ossification.

Location

Ablitech is located at the University of Maryland BioPark. The corporation relocated to Baltimore, Maryland in early 2012.

Research

Ablitech's signature product, VersadelTM, is a nucleic acid platform delivery technology that “provides a non-toxic, biocompatible method for the systemic and local delivery of antisense DNA and siRNA in the body.”

Awards

 PineBelt Innovator Award, 2008
 Invent Your Future, 2006 
 National FedEx Technology Business Plan Competition, 2006.

References

External links
 Ablitech's Homepage

Biotechnology companies of the United States
Hattiesburg, Mississippi
Companies based in Mississippi
Biotechnology companies established in 2006
2006 establishments in Mississippi